The Veterans Benefits Administration (VBA) is an agency of the U.S. Department of Veterans Affairs. It is responsible for administering the department's programs that provide financial and other forms of assistance to veterans, their dependents, and survivors. Major benefits include Veterans' compensation, Veterans' pension, survivors' benefits, rehabilitation and employment assistance, education assistance, home loan guaranties, and life insurance coverage.

VBA's Mission 

The mission of the Veterans Benefits Administration, in partnership with the Veterans Health Administration and the National Cemetery Administration, is to provide benefits and services to the veterans and their families in a responsive, timely and compassionate manner in recognition of their service to the Nation.

and

Programs Administered by VBA 

VBA is one of three administrations falling under the Department of Veterans Affairs' larger umbrella. Along with the Veterans Health Administration and the National Cemetery Administration, VBA is responsible for administering VA's extensive non-medical benefits. According to VA's 2010 Organizational Briefing Book, VBA is further subdivided into business lines covering specific benefits:

Compensation and Pension Service 

Compensation and Pension Programs provide direct payments to Veterans, dependents, and survivors as a result of the veteran's service-connected disability or because of financial need.

 Disability Compensation is a monetary benefit paid to Veterans with disabilities that are the result of a disease or injury incurred or aggravated during active military service. The benefit amount is graduated according to the degree of the veteran's disability on a scale from 10 percent to 100 percent (in increments of 10 percent).  It is possible to have a non-compensable rating (zero percent) for a disability as well.  The veteran can receive free treatment in the VA medical system for such a condition but will not receive monetary compensation for it. 
 Dependency and Indemnity Compensation (DIC) benefits are generally payable to the survivors of servicemembers who died while on active duty or survivors of Veterans who died from their service-connected disabilities.
 Pension programs are designed to provide income support to Veterans with wartime service and their families for a nonservice-connected disability or death.  These programs are for low-income Veterans and survivors.
 Burial and Interment Allowances are payable for certain Veterans.  A higher rate of burial allowance applies if the Veteran's death is service-connected.
 Spina Bifida Monthly Allowance under 38 U.S.C. 1805 is provided for children born with Spina Bifida who are children of individuals who served in the Republic of Vietnam during the Vietnam Era or served in or near the demilitarization zone in Korea during the period September 1, 1967, through August 31, 1971.  Payment is made at one of three levels and is based on degree of disability suffered by the child.
 Children of Women Vietnam Veterans Born with Certain Defects  This program provides a monetary allowance, healthcare, and vocational training benefits to eligible children born to women who served in the Republic of Vietnam during the period beginning on February 28, 1961, and ending May 7, 1975, if they suffer from certain covered birth defects.  VA identifies the birth defects as those that are associated with the service of the mother in Vietnam and result in permanent physical or mental disability.
 S. 2258, Veterans' Compensation Cost-of-Living Adjustment Act of 2014: guaranteed cost-of-living increase by 1.5% for disability compensation, and other specified categories.

Education Programs 

Education Programs provide resources to Veterans, servicepersons, reservists, and certain Veterans' dependents to help with readjustment and restore educational opportunities lost because of service to the country, to extend benefits of higher education to qualified persons who may not otherwise be able to afford it, to aid in military recruitment and the retention of highly qualified personnel, to encourage membership in the Selected Reserve, and to enhance the national workforce.  Details may be found at www.gibill.va.gov. 
 
 Post-Vietnam Era Veterans Educational Assistance Program (VEAP) is available for eligible Veterans who entered active duty between January 1, 1977, and June 30, 1985.  Benefits and entitlement are determined by the contributions paid while on active duty and Veterans have 10 years after separation in which to use the benefit.
 Montgomery GI Bill – Active Duty (MGIB) provides a program of education benefits that may be used while on active duty or after separation.  There are several distinct eligibility categories.  Generally a Veteran will receive 36 months of entitlement and has 10 years after separation to use the benefit.
 Montgomery GI Bill – Selected Reserve (MGIB-SR) is a program funded and managed by the Department of Defense (DoD) and is available to members of the Selected Reserve.  VA administers this program but DoD determines the member's eligibility.  Generally a qualified member of the Reserve will receive 36 months of entitlement and will have 14 years in which to use the benefit.
 Reservists Educational Assistance Program (REAP) is a program funded and managed by DoD and is available to members of the Selected or Ready Reserve  who are called to active duty to support contingency operations.  VA administers this program but DoD determines the member's eligibility.  Generally a qualified member of the Selected or Ready Reserve will receive 36 months of entitlement and will be able to use the benefit as long as he or she remains in the Selected or Ready Reserve.
 National Call to Service is a program of education benefits that may be used while on active duty or after separation.  The person must have enlisted on or after October 1, 2003, under the National Call to Service program and selected one of the two education incentives provided by that program.  A Veteran will receive education benefits based on the education initiative selected.  These are either (1) education benefits of up to 12 months of MGIB benefits (the 3-year rate) or (2) education benefits of up to 36 months of the MGIB benefits (half the 2-year rate).
 Dependents Educational Assistance Program (DEA) is designed to assist dependents of Veterans who (1) have been determined to be 100 percent permanently and totally disabled due to a service connected condition, (2) died due to a service-connected condition, or (3) died while on active duty.  Dependents typically receive 45 months of eligibility.  The criteria for using this benefit are:
 Children have 8 years to use this benefit.
 A spouse of a living Veteran has 10 years to use this benefit.
 A surviving spouse of a Veteran who died with a 100 percent service-connected condition has 10 years to use this benefit.
 A surviving spouse of a Veteran who died on active duty has 20 years to use this benefit.
 Post-9/11 Educational Assistance Program (Post 9/11-GI Bill) is a new education assistance program for certain individuals with a qualifying period of active duty service after  September 10, 2001.  Individuals will be eligible for educational assistance in the form of tuition and fees, a monthly housing allowance, and a books and supplies stipend.  The new program also provides certain individuals the opportunity to transfer unused educational benefits to their spouses and children.  The new program is effective August 1, 2009.  The Post-9/11 GI Bill also includes the Marine Gunnery Sergeant John David Fry Scholarship Program for the children of servicemembers who died while on active duty.

Insurance Programs 

The Insurance Programs were created to provide life insurance at a "standard" premium rate to members of the armed forces who are exposed to the extra hazards of military service.  Veterans are eligible to maintain their VA life insurance following discharge.  In general, a new program was created for each wartime period since World War I.  There are four life insurance programs that still issue coverage as well as a program of traumatic injury coverage: 
 
 Servicemembers' Group Life Insurance (SGLI) – Provides up to $400,000 of life insurance coverage to active-duty members of the Uniformed Services and members of the Reserves, cadets and midshipmen of the four service academies, members of the Reserve Officer Training Corps, and members who volunteer for assignment to a mobilization category in the Individual Ready Reserve.  SGLI also offers Family Servicemembers' Group Life Insurance (FSGLI) for up to $100,000 in coverage for a servicemember's spouse, if the servicemember is on active duty or a member of the Ready Reserve of a uniformed service.  All dependent children are automatically insured for $10,000 at no charge.
 Veterans' Group Life Insurance (VGLI) – Individuals who separate from service with SGLI coverage can convert their coverage to VGLI, regardless of health, by submitting an application with the first month's premium within 120 days of discharge.  After 120 days, the individual may still be granted VGLI provided evidence of insurability is submitted within one-year of the end of the 120-day period.  If the member is totally disabled at separation, SGLI coverage continues for free for two years, after which VGLI can be granted without evidence of insurability.
 Service-Disabled Veterans Insurance (SDVI) – A Veteran who has a VA service-connected disability rating but is otherwise in good health may apply for life insurance coverage of up to $10,000 within two years from the date of being notified by VA of the service-connected status.  This insurance is limited to Veterans who left service after April 25, 1951.  If the Veteran is totally disabled, premiums are waived, and he or she may apply for an additional $30,000 of coverage under this program.

Loan Guaranty 

The Loan Guaranty Program provides assistance to Veterans, certain spouses, and service members to enable them to buy and retain homes.  Assistance is provided through VA's  partial guaranty of loans made by private lenders in lieu of the substantial down payment and private mortgage insurance required in conventional mortgage transactions.  This protection means that in most cases qualified Veterans can obtain a loan without making a down payment. Also, the Loan Guaranty Program offers the following:   
 
 Specially Adapted Housing (SAH) Grants are available to Veterans that have specific service-connected disabilities for the purpose of constructing an adapted dwelling or modifying an existing dwelling to meet the Veterans needs.  The goal of the SAH Program is to provide a barrier-free living environment that affords the Veterans a level of independent living he or she may not have otherwise enjoyed.
 Native American Direct Home Loans are available to eligible Native American Veterans and, in certain circumstances, spouses who wish to purchase or construct a home on trust lands.  These loans are direct loans made by the Department of Veterans Affairs.
 Servicing Assistance provides help for borrowers having difficulty in making their loan payments.  The assistance can take several forms but the goal is to try to keep the Veteran in the property and avoid foreclosure.
 Veterans Mortgage Life Insurance (VMLI) – Mortgage life insurance protection for up to $200,000 is available to severely disabled Veterans who receive a SAH Grant.
 Servicemembers' Traumatic Injury Protection (TSGLI) - is a rider to the SGLI policies and provides automatic traumatic injury coverage to all servicemembers under SGLI, effective December 1, 2005.  It provides for payment between $25,000 and $100,000 (depending on the type of injury) to SGLI members who sustain a traumatic injury that results in certain severe losses.  The benefit is retroactive to October 7, 2001, if the loss was a direct result of injuries incurred in Operations Enduring Freedom or Iraqi Freedom.

Vocational Rehabilitation and Employment
The Vocational Rehabilitation and Employment (VR&E) Program is authorized by Congress under Title 38, USC, Chapter 31 and Code of Federal Regulations, Part 21. It is sometimes referred to as the Chapter 31 program. This program assists Veterans with service-connected disabilities to prepare for, find, and keep suitable jobs. For Veterans with service-connected disabilities so severe that they cannot immediately consider work, this program offers services to improve their ability to live as independently as possible. Services that may be provided by the VR&E Program include:

 Comprehensive rehabilitation evaluation to determine abilities, skills, and interests for employment
 Vocational counseling and rehabilitation planning for employment services
 Employment services such as job-training, job-seeking skills, resume development, and other work readiness assistance
 Assistance finding and keeping a job, including the use of special employer incentives and job accommodations
 On the Job Training (OJT), apprenticeships, and non-paid work experiences
 Post-secondary training at a college, vocational, technical or business school
 Supportive rehabilitation services including case management, counseling, and medical referrals
 Independent living services for Veterans unable to work due to the severity of their disabilities

References

External links
Veterans Benefits Administration

Disability organizations based in the United States
United States Department of Veterans Affairs